Donald Lee Davis (December 18, 1933 – August 8, 1962) was an American racecar driver.

Born in Tucson, Arizona, Davis died in Dayton, Ohio as a result of injuries suffered in a sprint car race at New Bremen Speedway.  He drove in the USAC Championship Car series, racing in the 1960-1962 seasons with 15 starts, including the 1961 and 1962 Indianapolis 500 races.  He finished in the top ten 8 times, with his two best finishes in 3rd at Trenton and in 4th at Indianapolis, both in 1962. Davis served in the Korean War.

Indy 500 results

External links
 http://www.oldracingcars.com/driver/Don_Davis

References

1933 births
1962 deaths
Indianapolis 500 drivers
Racing drivers from Tucson, Arizona
Sportspeople from Tucson, Arizona
Racing drivers from Arizona
Racing drivers who died while racing
Sports deaths in Ohio